LCU-2001-class utility landing craft is a class of utility landing craft of the Japan Maritime Self-Defense Force. Two craft were constructed in the 1980s.

Description 
The vessel are an LCU type transport boat for transporting personnel and supplies to remote coastal areas and remote islands.

It is said that this model can carry up to 200 people and 25 tons of supplies. The bottom of the ship is flat for beaching, and there is an anchor at the stern for use in reefing. The front part of the ship is an open loading space where vehicles and supplies are loaded. In addition, 70 troops can be installed. It is almost the same size as the U.S. Army's , but the displacement is different, and while the Runnymede class can carry three tanks, this model does not support the mounting of tanks due to weight. It is said that this is due to the emphasis on long-distance transportation capacity of personnel.

The method of landing supplies is to sit on the shore and lower the bow lamp on the bow. In the Yura class, there were two stages, a bow door and a lamp, but in this type, there is only one bow lamp, and the bow shape is also flat. At the rear of the ship is a bridge, as well as a troop residence and engine department. As an armament, it is equipped with one JM61 20 mm cannon, which is a human-powered gun, at the top of the bridge.

Ships in the class

Gallery

References 

Ships built by Sasebo Naval Arsenal
Amphibious warfare vessels of the Japan Maritime Self-Defense Force
Landing craft